The United States Constitution contains several provisions regarding criminal procedure, including: Article Three, along with Amendments Five, Six, Eight, and Fourteen.  Such cases have come to comprise a substantial portion of the Supreme Court's docket.

Article Three

Jury Clause
See #Jury Clauses

Venue Clause
Ex parte Bollman, 8 U.S. (4 Cranch) 75, 135–37 (1807)
United States v. Dawson, 56 U.S. (15 How.) 467, 487–88 (1853)
United States v. Jackalow, 66 U.S. (1 Black) 484 (1861)
Cook v. United States, 138 U.S. 157 (1891)
Horner v. United States, 143 U.S. 207, 213–14 (1892)
Dealy v. United States, 152 U.S. 539, 546–47 (1894)
Burton v. United States, 196 U.S. 283 (1905)
Hyde v. Shine, 199 U.S. 62, 76–78 (1905)
Burton v. United States, 202 U.S. 344, 381–89 (1906)
Armour Packing Co. v. United States, 209 U.S. 56, 76–77 (1908)
United States v. Cores, 356 U.S. 405, 407 (1958)
Travis v. United States, 364 U.S. 631, 634–35 (1961)
United States v. Cabrales, 524 U.S. 1 (1998)

Fifth Amendment

Grand Jury Clause
Hurtado v. California, 110 U.S. 516 (1884)
Ex parte Wilson, 114 U.S. 417 (1885)
United States v. Petit, 114 U.S. 429 (1885)
Mackin v. United States, 117 U.S. 348 (1886)
Ex parte Bain, 121 U.S. 1 (1887), overruled in part by United States v. Cotton, 535 U.S. 625 (2002)
Parkinson v. United States, 121 U.S. 281 (1887)
McNulty v. California, 149 US 645, 648 (1893)
Wong Wing v. United States, 163 U.S. 228 (1896)
Maxwell v. Dow, 176 U.S. 581, 584–86 (1900)
Lem Woon v. Oregon, 229 U.S. 586 (1913)
United States v. Moreland, 258 U.S. 433 (1922)
Costello v. United States, 350 U.S. 359 (1956)
Lawn v. United States, 355 U.S. 339, 349 (1958)
Green v. United States, 356 U.S. 165, 183–87 (1958)
Stirone v. United States, 361 U.S. 212 (1960)
Beck v. Washington, 369 U.S. 541, 545–55 (1962)
United States v. Miller, 471 U.S. 130 (1985)
Midland Asphalt Corp. v. United States, 489 U.S. 794, 802 (1989)
United States v. Cotton, 535 U.S. 625 (2002)

Double Jeopardy Clause
United States v. Perez, 22 U.S. (9 Wheat.) 579, 580 (1824)*
United States v. Wilson, 32 U.S. (7 Pet.) 150, 159–60 (1833)*
United States v. Randenbush, 33 U.S. (8 Pet.) 288, 290 (1834)*
Fox v. Ohio, 46 U.S. (5 How.) 410 (1847)
Moore v. Illinois, 55 U.S. (14 How.) 13 (1852)
United States v. Nickerson, 58 U.S. (17 How.) 204 (1854)*
Ex parte Lange, 85 U.S. (18 Wall.) 163 (1873)
Ex parte Bigelow, 113 U.S. 328 (1885)
Coffey v. United States, 116 U.S. 436 (1886), overruled by United States v. One Assortment of 89 Firearms, 465 U.S. 354 (1984)
Ball v. United States, 163 U.S. 662 (1896)
Burton v. United States, 202 U.S. 344, 378–81 (1906)
Brantley v. Georgia, 217 U.S. 284 (1910) (per curiam), overruled by Price v. Georgia, 398 U.S. 323 (1970)
United States v. La Franca, 282 U.S. 568 (1931)
Blockburger v. United States, 284 U.S. 299 (1932)
Palko v. Connecticut, 302 U.S. 319 (1937), overruled by Benton v. Maryland, 395 U.S. 784 (1969)
Helvering v. Mitchell, 303 U.S. 391, 398–405 (1938)
United States ex rel. Marcus v. Hess, 317 US 537, 548–52 (1943)
Louisiana ex rel. Francis v. Resweber, 329 U.S. 459 (1947)
Bryan v. United States, 338 U.S. 552 (1950), overruled by Burks v. United States, 437 U.S. 1 (1978)
Sapir v. United States, 348 U.S. 373 (1955), overruled by Burks v. United States, 437 U.S. 1 (1978)
Rex Trailer Co. v. United States, 350 U.S. 148 (1956)
Yates v. United States, 354 U.S. 298 (1957), overruled by Burks v. United States, 437 U.S. 1 (1978)
Green v. United States, 355 U.S. 184 (1957)
Hoag v. New Jersey, 356 U.S. 464 (1958), overruled by Ashe v. Swenson, 397 U.S. 436 (1970)
Bartkus v. Illinois, 359 U.S. 121 (1959)
Forman v. United States, 361 U.S. 416 (1960), overruled by Burks v. United States, 437 U.S. 1 (1978)
Fong Foo v. United States, 369 U.S. 141 (1962)
United States v. Tateo, 377 U.S. 463 (1964)
Baxstrom v. Herold, 383 U.S. 107 (1966)
North Carolina v. Pearce, 395 U.S. 711 (1969)
Benton v. Maryland, 395 U.S. 784 (1969)
Waller v. Florida, 397 U.S. 387 (1970)
Ashe v. Swenson,  397 U.S. 436 (1970)
Price v. Georgia, 398 U.S. 323 (1970)
Serfass v. United States, 420 U.S. 377 (1973)
Wilson v. United States, 420 U.S. 332 (1975)
United States v. Jenkins, 420 U.S. 358 (1975), overruled by United States v. Scott, 437 U.S. 82 (1978)
United States v. Dinitz, 424 U.S. 600 (1976)
Ludwig v. Massachusetts, 427 U.S. 600 (1976)
United States v. Martin Linen Supply Co., 430 U.S. 564 (1977)
Brown v. Ohio, 432 U.S. 161 (1977)
Harris v. Oklahoma, 433 U.S. 682 (1977) (per curiam)
Arizona v. Washington, 434 U.S. 497 (1978)
Burks v. United States, 437 U.S. 1 (1978)
Crist v. Bretz, 437 U.S. 28 (1978)
Sanabria v. United States,  437 U.S. 54 (1978)
United States v. Scott, 437 U.S. 82 (1978)
Whalen v. United States, 445 U.S. 684 (1980)
Oregon v. Kennedy, 456 U.S. 667 (1982)
Tibbs v. Florida, 457 U.S. 31 (1982)
Missouri v. Hunter, 459 U.S. 359 (1983)
United States v. One Assortment of 89 Firearms, 465 U.S. 354 (1984)
Justices of Boston Municipal Court v. Lydon, 466 U.S. 294 (1984)
Garrett v. United States,  471 U.S. 773 (1985)
Heath v. Alabama, 474 U.S. 82 (1985)
Morris v. Mathews, 475 U.S. 237 (1986)
United States v. Halper, 490 U.S. 435 (1989), overruled by Hudson v. United States, 522 U.S. 93 (1997)
Grady v. Corbin, 495 U.S. 508 (1990), overruled by United States v. Dixon, 509 U.S. 688 (1993)
United States v. Felix, 503 U.S. 378 (1992)
United States v. Dixon, 509 U.S. 688 (1993)
Department of Revenue of Montana v. Kurth Ranch, 511 U.S. 767 (1994)
Rutledge v. United States, 517 U.S. 292 (1996)
Hudson v. United States, 522 U.S. 93 (1997)
United States v. Lara, 541 U.S. 193 (2004)
Smith v. Massachusetts, 543 U.S. 462 (2005)
Yeager v. United States, 557 U.S. 110 (2009)
Renico v. Lett, 130 S. Ct. 1855 (2010)
Blueford v. Arkansas, No. 10–1320 (May 24, 2012)

Self-Incrimination Clause
Concerning only incrimination that occurs in the courtroom
Twining v. New Jersey, 211 U.S. 78 (1908)
Griffin v. California, 380 U.S. 609 (1965)
Miranda v. Arizona, 384 U.S. 436 (1966)
Tehan v. United States ex rel. Shott, 382 U.S. 406 (1966)
Williams v. Florida, 399 U.S. 78 (1970)
Brooks v. Tennessee, 406 U.S. 605, 607–12 (1972)
Lakeside v. Oregon, 435 U.S. 333 (1978)
James v. Kentucky, 466 U.S. 341 (1984)
Mitchell v. United States, 526 U.S. 314 (1999)

Due process
See #Criminal due process

Sixth Amendment

Speedy Trial Clause
Beavers v. Haubert, 198 U.S. 77, 86–91 (1905)
United States v. Provoo, 350 U.S. 857 (1955) (per curiam), aff'g Petition of Provoo, 17 F.R.D. 183, 196–203 (D. Md. 1955)
Pollard v. United States, 352 U.S. 354, 361 62 (1957)
United States v. Ewell, 383 U.S. 116, 120–22 (1966)
Klopfer v. North Carolina, 386 U.S. 213 (1967)
Smith v. Hooey, 393 U.S. 374 (1969)
Dickey v. Florida, 398 U.S. 30 (1970)
United States v. Marion, 404 U.S. 307 (1971)
Barker v. Wingo, 407 U.S. 514 (1972)
Braden v. 30th Judicial Circuit Court, 410 U.S. 484 (1973)
Strunk v. United States, 412 U.S. 434 (1973)
United States v. Lovasco, 431 U.S. 783 (1977)
United States v. MacDonald, 456 U.S. 1 (1982)
United States v. Loud Hawk, 474 U.S. 302 (1986)
Doggett v. United States, 505 U.S. 647 (1992)
Vermont v. Brillon, 129 S. Ct. 1283 (2009)
Omar Magatheh v. Noran Magatheh, 129 S. Ct. 1283 (2009)

Public Trial Clause
Gaines v. Washington, 277 U.S. 81 84–86 (1928)
In re Oliver, 333 U.S. 257, 266–73 (1948) 
Gannett Co., Inc. v. DePasquale, 443 U.S. 368, 379–91 (1979)
Waller v. Georgia, 467 U.S. 39 (1984)
Presley v. Georgia, 130 S. Ct. 721 (2010) (per curiam)

Jury Clauses

Availability of the jury
Callan v. Wilson, 127 U.S. 540 (1888)
Natal v. State, 139 U.S. 621 (1891)
Schick v. United States, 195 U.S. 65 (1904)
District of Columbia v. Colts, 282 U.S. 63 (1930)
District of Columbia v. Clawans, 300 U.S. 617 (1937)
United States v. Barnett, 376 U.S. 681 (1964)
Cheff v. Schnackenberg, 384 U.S. 373 (1966)
Duncan v. Louisiana, 391 U.S. 145 (1968)
Bloom v. Illinois, 391 U.S. 194 (1968)
DeStefano v. Woods, 392 U.S. 631 (1968) (per curiam)
Frank v. United States, 395 U.S. 147 (1969)
Baldwin v. New York, 399 U.S. 117 (1970)
Mayberry v. Pennsylvania, 400 U.S. 455 (1971)
Taylor v. Haynes, 418 U.S. 488 (1974)
Codispoti v. Pennsylvania, 418 U.S. 506 (1974)
Blanton v. North Las Vegas, 489 U.S. 538 (1989)
United States v. Nachtigal, 507 U.S. 1 (1993)
Lewis v. United States, 518 U.S. 322 (1996)

Impartiality
Reynolds v. United States, 98 U.S. (8 Otto.) 145, 154–57 (1878)
Connors v. United States, 158 U.S. 408, 411–16 (1895)
Aldridge v. United States, 283 U.S. 308 (1931)
Buchalter v. New York, 319 U.S. 427, 430 (1943)
Dennis v. United States, 339 U.S. 162 (1950)
Irvin v. Dowd, 366 U.S. 717 (1961)
Beck v. Washington, 369 U.S. 541 (1962)
Rideau v. Louisiana, 373 U.S. 723 (1963)
Sheppard v. Maxwell, 384 U.S. 333 (1966)
Witherspoon v. Illinois, 391 U.S. 510 (1968)
Ham v. South Carolina, 409 U.S. 524 (1973)
Murphy v. Florida, 421 U.S. 794 (1975)
Ristaino v. Ross, 424 U.S. 589 (1976)
Adams v. Texas, 448 U.S. 38 (1980)
Rosales-Lopez v. United States, 451 U.S. 182 (1981)
Patton v. Yount, 467 U.S. 1025 (1984)
Wainwright v. Witt, 469 U.S. 412 (1985)
Turner v. Murray, 476 U.S. 28 (1986)
Lockhart v. McCree, 476 U.S. 162 (1986)
Gray v. Mississippi, 481 U.S. 648 (1987)
Ross v. Oklahoma, 487 U.S. 81 (1988)
Mu'Min v. Virginia, 500 U.S. 415 (1991)
Morgan v. Illinois, 504 U.S. 719 (1992)
United States v. Martinez-Salazar, 528 U.S. 304 (2000)
Skilling v. United States, 130 S. Ct. 2896, 2912–25 (2010)

Facts found
McMillan v. Pennsylvania, 477 U.S. 79 (1986)
Walton v. Arizona, 497 U.S. 639 (1990), overruled by Ring v. Arizona, 536 U.S. 584 (2002)
Almendarez-Torres v. United States, 523 U.S. 224 (1998)
Jones v. United States, 526 U.S. 227 (1999)
Apprendi v. New Jersey, 530 U.S. 466 (2000)
Harris v. United States, 536 U.S. 545 (2002)
Ring v. Arizona, 536 U.S. 584 (2002)
Blakely v. Washington, 542 U.S. 296 (2004)
Schriro v. Summerlin, 542 U.S. 348 (2004)
United States v. Booker, 543 U.S. 220 (2005)
Washington v. Recuenco, 548 U.S. 212 (2006)
Cunningham v. California, 549 U.S. 270 (2007)
Oregon v. Ice, 555 U.S. 160 (2009)
Southern Union Co. v. United States, No 11-94 (U.S. June 21, 2012)
McKinney v. Arizona 589 U.S. ___ (2020)

Size and unanimity
Thompson v. Utah, 170 U.S. 343 (1898),  overruled by Williams v. Florida, 399 U.S. 78 (1970)
Maxwell v. Dow, 176 U.S. 581, 586–605 (1900),  overruled in part by Williams v. Florida, 399 U.S. 78 (1970)
Rassmussen v. United States, 197 U.S. 516 (1905),  overruled by Williams v. Florida, 399 U.S. 78 (1970)
Patton v. United States, 281 U.S. 276 (1930), overruled by Williams v. Florida, 399 U.S. 78 (1970)
Williams v. Florida, 399 U.S. 78 (1970)
Apodaca v. Oregon, 406 U.S. 404 (1972)
Ballew v. Georgia,  435 U.S. 223 (1978)
Burch v. Louisiana, 441 U.S. 130 (1979)

Vicinage
United States v. Dawson, 56 U.S. (15 How.) 467, 487 (1853)
Jones v. United States, 137 U.S. 202, 211 (1890) 
Cook v. United States, 138 U.S. 157, 181 (1891)
Burton v. United States, 196 U.S. 283 (1905)
Burton v. United States, 202 U.S. 344, 381–89 (1906)
Ruthenberg v. United States, 245 U.S. 480, 482 (1918)
Lewis v. United States, 279 U.S. 63, 72–73 (1929)
United States v. Cabrales, 524 U.S. 1 (1998)

Information Clause
United States v. Gooding, 25 U.S. (12 Wheat.) 460, 473–75 (1827)*
United States v. Mills, 32 U.S. (7 Pet.) 138 (1833)*
Twitchell v. Pennsylvania, 74 U.S. (7 Wall.) 321 (1868)
Cole v. Arkansas, 333 U.S. 196 (1948)
Russell v. United States, 369 U.S. 749 (1962)

Confrontation Clause

Out-of-court statements
Reynolds v. United States, 98 U.S. (8 Otto.) 145, 158–61 (1878)
Mattox v. United States, 156 U.S. 237, 240–44 (1895)
Kirby v. United States, 174 U.S. 47 (1899)
Motes v. United States, 178 U.S. 458 (1900)
Dowdell v. United States, 221 U.S. 325 (1911)
Pointer v. Texas, 380 U.S. 400 (1965)
Brookhart v. Janis, 384 U.S. 1 (1966)
Barber v. Page, 390 U.S. 719 (1968)
Bruton v. United States, 391 U.S. 123 (1968)
Berger v. California, 393 U.S. 314 (1969)
Frazier v. Cupp, 394 U.S. 731, 733–37 (1969)
California v. Green, 399 U.S. 149 (1970)
Dutton v. Evans, 400 U.S. 74 (1970)
Mancusi v. Stubbs, 408 U.S. 204 (1972)
Ohio v. Roberts, 448 U.S. 56 (1980), overruled by Crawford v. Washington, 541 U.S. 36 (2004)
Tennessee v. Street, 471 U.S. 409 (1985)
Delaware v. Fensterer, 474 U.S. 15, 18–19 (1985) (per curiam)
United States v. Inadi, 475 U.S. 387 (1986)
Lee v. Illinois, 476 U.S. 530 (1986)
Crawford v. Washington, 541 U.S. 36 (2004)
Davis v. Washington, 547 U.S. 813 (2006)
Whorton v. Bockting, 549 U.S. 406 (2007)
Giles v. California, 554 U.S. 353 (2008)
Melendez-Diaz v. Massachusetts, 557 U.S. 305 (2009)
Michigan v. Bryant, 131 S. Ct. 1143 (2011)
Bullcoming v. New Mexico, 131 S. Ct. 2705 (2011)
Williams v. Illinois, No. 10–8505 (June 18, 2012)

Face-to-face confrontation
Snyder v. Massachusetts, 291 U.S. 97 (1934)
Kentucky v. Stincer, 482 U.S. 730 (1987)
Coy v. Iowa, 487 U.S. 1012 (1988)
Maryland v. Craig, 497 U.S. 836 (1990)

Restrictions on cross-examination
Douglas v. Alabama, 380 U.S. 415 (1965)
McCray v. Illinois, 386 U.S. 300, 314 (1967)
Smith v. Illinois, 390 U.S. 129 (1968)
Chambers v. Mississippi, 410 U.S. 284 (1973)
Davis v. Alaska, 415 U.S. 308 (1974)
Delaware v. Fensterer, 474 U.S. 15, 19–23 (1985) (per curiam)
Delaware v. Van Arsdall, 475 U.S. 673 (1986)

Right to present relevant evidence
McCray v. Illinois, 386 U.S. 300, 313–14 (1967)
Pennsylvania v. Ritchie, 480 U.S. 39, 51–54 (1987)
Olden v. Kentucky, 488 U.S. 227 (1988) (per curiam)
Michigan v. Lucas, 500 U.S. 145 (1991)

Compulsory Process Clause
United States v. Van Duzee, 140 U.S. 169, 172–73 (1891)
Blackmer v. United States, 284 U.S. 421, 442 (1932)
Pate v. Robinson, 383 U.S. 375, 378 n.1 (1966)
Washington v. Texas, 388 U.S. 14 (1967)
United States v. Valenzuela-Bernal, 458 U.S. 858 (1982)
Pennsylvania v. Ritchie, 480 U.S. 39, 55–58 (1987)
Rock v. Arkansas, 483 U.S. 44 (1987)
Taylor v. Illinois, 484 U.S. 400 (1988)

Assistance of Counsel Clause

Choice of counsel
Chandler v. Fretag, 348 U.S. 3 (1954)
Morris v. Slappy, 461 U.S. 1 (1983)
Wheat v. United States, 486 U.S. 153 (1988)
Caplin & Drysdale, Chartered v. United States, 491 U.S. 617 (1989)
United States v. Gonzalez-Lopez, 548 U.S. 140 (2006)

Appointment of counsel
Powell v. Alabama, 287 U.S. 45 (1932)
Johnson v. Zerbst, 304 U.S. 458 (1938)
Walker v. Johnston, 312 U.S. 275, 286–87 (1941) 
Holiday v. Johnston, 313 U.S. 342 (1941)
Betts v. Brady, 316 U.S. 455 (1942), overruled by Gideon v. Wainwright, 372 U.S. 335 (1963)
Hamilton v. Alabama, 368 U.S. 52 (1961)
Gideon v. Wainwright, 372 U.S. 335 (1963)
Douglas v. California, 372 U.S. 353 (1963)
Anders v. California, 386 U.S. 738 (1967)
Argersinger v. Hamlin, 407 U.S. 25 (1972)
Gagnon v. Scarpelli, 411 U.S. 778 (1973)
Ross v. Moffitt, 417 U.S. 600 (1974)
Scott v. Illinois, 440 U.S. 367 (1979)
Baldasar v. Illinois, 446 U.S. 222 (1980), overruled by Nichols v. United States, 511 U.S. 738 (1994)
Pennsylvania v. Finley, 481 U.S. 551 (1987)
McCoy v. Court of Appeals of Wisconsin, 486 U.S. 429 (1988)
Penson v. Ohio,  488 U.S. 75 (1988)
Murray v. Giarratano, 492 U.S. 1 (1989)
Coleman v. Thompson, 501 U.S. 722 (1991)
Nichols v. United States, 511 U.S. 738 (1994)
Smith v. Robbins, 528 U.S. 259 (2000)
Alabama v. Shelton, 535 U.S. 654 (2002)

Constructive denial
Avery v. Alabama, 308 U.S. 444 (1940)
Ferguson v. Georgia, 365 U.S. 570 (1961)
Brooks v. Tennessee, 406 U.S. 605, 612–13 (1972)
Herring v. New York, 422 U.S. 853 (1975)
Geders v. United States, 425 U.S. 80 (1976)
Weatherford v. Bursey, 429 U.S. 545 (1977)
United States v. Morrison, 449 U.S. 361 (1981)
Perry v. Leeke, 488 U.S. 272 (1989)

Critical stages
Reece v. Georgia, 350 U.S. 85 (1955)
Hamilton v. Alabama, 368 U.S. 52 (1961)
United States v. Wade, 388 U.S. 218 (1967)
Gilbert v. California, 388 U.S. 263, 267, 269–74 (1967)
Coleman v. Alabama, 399 U.S. 1 (1970)
United States v. Ash, 413 U.S. 300 (1973)

Conflict-free counsel
Glasser v. United States, 315 U.S. 60, 68–77 (1942)
Dukes v. Warden, 406 U.S. 250 (1972)
Holloway v. Arkansas, 435 U.S. 475 (1978)
Cuyler v. Sullivan, 446 U.S. 335, 345–50 (1980)
Burger v. Kemp, 483 U.S. 776 (1987)
Mickens v. Taylor, 535 U.S. 162 (2002)

Ineffective assistance of counsel
McMann v. Richardson, 397 U.S. 759 (1970)
United States v. Cronic, 466 U.S. 648 (1984)
Strickland v. Washington, 466 U.S. 668 (1984)
Evitts v. Lucey, 469 U.S. 387 (1985)
Hill v. Lockhart, 474 U.S. 52 (1985)
Nix v. Whiteside, 475 U.S. 157 (1986)
Kimmelman v. Morrison, 477 U.S. 365 (1986)
Lockhart v. Fretwell, 506 U.S. 364 (1993)
Smith v. Robbins, 528 U.S. 259 (2000)
Roe v. Flores-Ortega, 528 U.S. 470 (2000)
Williams v. Taylor, 529 U.S. 362 (2000)
Glover v. United States, 531 U.S. 198 (2001)
Bell v. Cone, 535 U.S. 685 (2002) (per curiam)
Woodford v. Visciotti, 537 U.S. 19 (2002) (per curiam)
Wiggins v. Smith, 539 U.S. 510 (2003)
Holland v. Jackson, 542 U.S. 649 (2004) (per curiam)
Florida v. Nixon, 543 U.S. 175 (2004)
Rompilla v. Beard, 545 U.S. 374 (2005)
Schriro v. Landrigan, 550 U.S. 465 (2007)
Wright v. Van Patten, 552 U.S. 120 (2008) (per curiam)
Knowles v. Mirzayance, 556 U.S. 111 (2009)
Bobby v. Van Hook, 130 S. Ct. 13 (2009) (per curiam)
Wong v. Belmontes, 130 S. Ct. 383 (2009) (per curiam)
Porter v. McCollum, 130 S. Ct. 447 (2009) (per curiam)
Wood v. Allen, 130 S. Ct. 841 (2010)
Padilla v. Kentucky, 130 S. Ct. 1473 (2010)
Sears v. Upton, 130 S. Ct. 3259 (2010) (per curiam)
Premo v. Moore, 131 S. Ct. 733 (2011)
Harrington v. Richter, 131 S. Ct. 770 (2011)
Cullen v. Pinholster, 131 S. Ct. 1388 (2011)
Lafler v. Cooper, 132 S. Ct. 1376  (2012)
Missouri v. Frye, 132 S. Ct. 1399 (2012)

Pro se representation
Faretta v. California, 422 U.S. 806 (1975)
McKaskle v. Wiggins, 465 U.S. 168 (1984)
Rock v. Arkansas, 483 U.S. 44 (1987)
Martinez v. California Court of Appeals, 528 U.S. 152 (2000)
Indiana v. Edwards, 554 U.S. 164 (2008)

Eighth Amendment's Excessive Bail Clause
Stack v. Boyle, 342 U.S. 1 (1951)
Schilb v. Kuebel, 404 U.S. 357 (1971)
Murphy v. Hunt, 455 U.S. 478 (1982)
United States v. Salerno, 481 U.S. 739 (1987)

Fourteenth Amendment

Criminal due process
Also the Fifth Amendment
Minder v. Georgia, 183 U.S. 559 (1902)
Frank v. Mangum, 237 U.S. 309, 345 (1915)
Moore v. Dempsey, 261 U.S. 86 (1923)
Tumey v. Ohio, 273 U.S. 510 (1927)
Manley v. Georgia, 279 U.S. 1 (1929)
Buchalter v. New York, 319 U.S. 427, 430–31 (1943)

Proof beyond a reasonable doubt
Coffin v. United States, 156 U.S. 432 (1895)*
Leland v. Oregon, 343 U.S. 790 (1952)
Holland v. United States, 348 U.S. 121 (1954)
Leary v. United States, 395 U.S. 6, 29–54 (1959)
In re Winship, 397 U.S. 358 (1970)
Cool v. United States, 409 U.S. 100 (1972) (per curiam)
Mullaney v. Wilbur, 421 U.S. 684 (1975)
Patterson v. New York, 432 U.S. 197 (1977)
Hankerson v. North Carolina, 432 U.S. 233 (1977)
Taylor v. Kentucky, 436 U.S. 478 (1978)
County Court of Ulster Cty. v. Allen, 442 U.S. 140 (1979)
Sandstrom v. Montana, 442 U.S. 510 (1979)
Jackson v. Virginia, 443 U.S. 307 (1979)
Murray v. Carrier, 477 U.S. 478 (1986)
Cage v. Louisiana, 498 U.S. 39 (1990) (per curiam)
Sullivan v. Louisiana, 508 U.S. 275 (1993)
Victor v. Nebraska, 511 U.S. 1, 22 (1994)
Schlup v. Delo, 513 U.S. 298 (1995)

Use of false evidence
Mooney v. Holohan, 294 U.S. 103 (1935) (per curiam)
Hysler v. Florida, 315 U.S. 411 (1942)
Pyle v. Kansas, 317 U.S. 213 (1942)
New York ex rel. Whitman v. Wilson, 318 U.S. 688 (1943) (per curiam)
McDonough v. Smith, 139 S. Ct. 915 (2019)

Certain expenses for indigent defendants
Griffin v. Illinois, 351 U.S. 12 (1956)
Burns v. Ohio, 360 U.S. 252 (1959)
Britt v. North Carolina, 404 U.S. 226 (1971)
Ake v. Oklahoma, 470 U.S. 68 (1985)

Mental competence
Bishop v. United States, 350 U.S. 961 (1956) (per curiam)
Dusky v. United States, 362 U.S. 402 (1960) (per curiam)
Pate v. Robinson, 383 U.S. 375 (1966)
Drope v. Missouri, 420 U.S. 162 (1975)
Riggins v. Nevada, 504 U.S. 127 (1992)
Medina v. California, 505 U.S. 437 (1992)
Godinez v. Moran, 509 U.S. 389 (1993)
Cooper v. Oklahoma, 517 U.S. 348 (1996)
Sell v. United States, 539 U.S. 166 (2003)
Indiana v. Edwards, 554 U.S. 164 (2008)

Disclosure of exculpatory and impeachment material
Brady v. Maryland, 373 U.S. 83 (1963)
Giglio v. United States, 405 U.S. 150 (1972)
Moore v. Illinois, 408 U.S. 786 (1972)
United States v. Agurs, 427 U.S. 97 (1976)
California v. Trombetta, 467 U.S. 479 (1984)
United States v. Bagley, 473 U.S. 667 (1985)
Arizona v. Youngblood, 488 U.S. 51 (1988)
Kyles v. Whitley, 514 U.S. 419 (1995)
Wood v. Bartholomew, 516 U.S. 1 (1995) (per curiam)
Strickler v. Greene, 527 U.S. 263 (1999)
Williams v. Taylor, 529 U.S. 420 (2000)
United States v. Ruiz, 536 U.S. 622 (2002) 
Illinois v. Fisher, 540 U.S. 544 (2004) (per curiam)
Banks v. Dretke, 540 U.S. 668 (2004)
Youngblood v. West Virginia, 547 U.S. 867 (2006) (per curiam)
Cone v. Bell, 556 U.S. 449 (2009)
Smith v. Cain, 132 S. Ct. 627 (2012)

Right to present a defense
Rock v. Arkansas, 483 U.S. 44 (1987)

Equal protection and criminal procedure

Selective prosecution
McCleskey v. Kemp, 481 U.S. 279 (1987)
United States v. Armstrong, 517 U.S. 456 (1996)

Racial discrimination in the jury pool and venire
Strauder v. West Virginia, 100 U.S. 303 (1880)
Virginia v. Rives, 100 U.S. 313 (1880)
Neal v. Delaware, 103 U.S. 370 (1881)
Gibson v. Mississippi, 162 U.S. 565 (1896)
Smith v. Mississippi, 162 U.S. 592 (1896)
Carter v. Texas, 177 U.S. 442 (1900)
Tarrance v. Florida, 188 U.S. 519 (1903)
Brownfield v. South Carolina, 189 U.S. 426 (1903)
Rogers v. Alabama, 192 U.S. 226 (1904)
Franklin v. South Carolina, 218 U.S. 161, 165–68 (1910)
Norris v. Alabama, 294 U.S. 587 (1935)
Patterson v. Alabama, 294 U.S. 600 (1935)
Hale v. Kentucky, 303 U.S. 613 (1938) (per curiam)
Smith v. Texas, 311 U.S. 128 (1940)
Hill v. Texas, 316 U.S. 400 (1942)
Patton v. Mississippi, 332 U.S. 463 (1947)
Cassell v. Texas, 339 U.S. 282 (1950)
Brown v. Allen, 344 U.S. 443 (1953)
Avery v. Georgia, 345 U.S. 559 (1953)
Hernandez v. Texas, 347 U.S. 475 (1954)
Williams v. Georgia, 349 U.S. 375 (1955)
Reece v. Georgia, 350 U.S. 85 (1955)
Michel v. Louisiana, 350 U.S. 91 (1955)
Eubanks v. Louisiana, 356 U.S. 584 (1958)
Coleman v. Alabama, 389 U.S. 22 (1967)
Parker v. North Carolina, 397 U.S. 790, 798–99 (1970)
Davis v. United States, 411 U.S. 233 (1973)
Tollett v. Henderson, 411 U.S. 258 (1973)
Francis v. Henderson, 425 U.S. 536 (1976)
Rose v. Mitchell, 443 U.S. 545 (1979)
Vasquez v. Hillery, 474 U.S. 254 (1986)
Amadeo v. Zant, 486 U.S. 214 (1988)

Fair cross-section of the community
Kentucky v. Powers, 201 U.S. 1 (1906)
Glasser v. United States, 315 U.S. 60, 83–87 (1942)
Thiel v. Southern Pacific Co., 328 U.S. 217 (1946)
Ballard v. United States, 329 U.S. 187 (1946)
Taylor v. Louisiana, 419 U.S. 522 (1975)
Duren v. Missouri, 439 U.S. 357 (1979)
Holland v. Illinois, 493 U.S. 474 (1990)
Berghuis v. Smith, 130 S. Ct. 1382 (2010)

Discriminatory peremptory challenges
Batson v. Kentucky, 476 U.S. 79 (1986)
Griffith v. Kentucky, 479 U.S. 314 (1987)
Teague v. Lane, 489 U.S. 288 (1989)
Ford v. Georgia, 498 U.S. 411 (1991)
Powers v. Ohio, 499 U.S. 400 (1991)
Hernandez v. New York, 500 U.S. 352 (1991)
Trevino v. Texas, 503 U.S. 562 (1992) (per curiam)
Georgia v. McCollum, 505 U.S. 42 (1992)
J.E.B. v. Alabama ex rel. T.B.,  511 U.S. 127 (1994)
Purkett v. Elem, 514 U.S. 765 (1995) (per curiam)
Miller-El v. Cockrell (Miller-El I), 537 U.S. 322 (2003)
Johnson v. California, 543 U.S. 499 (2005)
Miller-El v. Dretke (Miller-El II),  545 U.S. 231 (2005)
Rice v. Collins, 546 U.S. 333 (2006)
Snyder v. Louisiana, 552 U.S. 472 (2008)
Rivera v. Illinois,  556 U.S. 148 (2009)
Thaler v. Haynes, 130 S. Ct. 1171 (2010) (per curiam)
Felkner v. Jackson, 131 S. Ct. 1305 (2011) (per curiam)
Flowers v. Mississippi, 139 S. Ct. 451 (2018)

References
Lester B. Orfield, A Resume of Decisions of the United States Supreme Court on Federal Criminal Procedure, 20  251 (1941).
Lester B. Orfield, A Resume of Supreme Court Decisions on Federal Criminal Procedure, 14  105 (1941).
Lester B. Orfield, A Resume of Supreme Court Decisions on Federal Criminal Procedure, 21  1 (1942).
Lester B. Orfield, A Resume of Decisions of the United States Supreme Court on Federal Criminal Procedure, 30  360 (1942).
Lester B. Orfield, A Resume of Decisions of the United States Supreme Court on Federal Criminal Procedure,  7  263 (1942).

Constitutional criminal procedure

United States Supreme Court criminal cases